William George Thompson (January 17, 1830 – April 2, 1911) was a Civil War officer, trial-court judge, territorial justice, and Republican Representative in the United States House of Iowa's 5th congressional district.

Biography
Thompson was born and raised in Butler, Pennsylvania, the younger brother of future Pennsylvania Congressman John McCandless Thompson.  In 1853, he was admitted to the bar and moved to Marion, Iowa. He became the prosecuting attorney for Linn County, Iowa in 1854, then left in 1856 to serve in the Iowa Senate, serving until 1860.  When the Civil War broke out he became a major in the 20th Iowa Volunteer Infantry Regiment.

After the War, he served as district attorney for Iowa's eighth judicial district for six years.  He then served briefly as Chief Justice of the Territory of Idaho, from January to April 1879.

In April 1879, Thompson resigned as Chief Justice to run as a Republican to represent Iowa's fifth district in the Forty-sixth Congress, to fill the vacancy caused by the death of Rush Clark.  Thompson won the special election, and served in most of the Forty-sixth Congress. In 1882, he was re-elected, serving in the Forty-seventh Congress, but chose not to run in 1884 for the Forty-eighth.

On his return to Iowa, Thompson served on the Marion City Council and ran for the Iowa General Assembly.  He served in the Iowa House of Representatives from 1885 to 1887.  Returning to the bench, he was elected as judge of Iowa's eighteenth judicial district, serving from 1894 to 1906.  He retired to Kenwood Park, Iowa where he died April 2, 1911.  He is interred at Oak Shade Cemetery in Marion.

References

 Retrieved on 2008-02-15

1830 births
1911 deaths
Iowa state court judges
People of Iowa in the American Civil War
Union Army officers
Republican Party members of the Iowa House of Representatives
Republican Party Iowa state senators
People from Butler County, Pennsylvania
People from Marion, Iowa
District attorneys in Iowa
Idaho Territory judges
Iowa city council members
Republican Party members of the United States House of Representatives from Iowa
19th-century American politicians
19th-century American judges
Military personnel from Pennsylvania